Nyírbátori Football Club is a professional football club based in Nyírbátor, Szabolcs-Szatmár-Bereg County, Hungary, that competes in the Nemzeti Bajnokság III, the third tier of Hungarian football.

Name changes
1951–53: Nyírbátori Kinizsi
1953–57: Nyírbátori SK
1957–?: Nyírbátori Spartacus
1976–91: Nyírbátori Báthory SC
1991–present: Nyírbátori Football Club

Honours
Nemzeti Bajnokság III:
Winner: 2000–01

Season results
As of 6 August 2017

References

External links
 Profile on Magyar Futball

Football clubs in Hungary
Association football clubs established in 1917
1917 establishments in Hungary